The 1796–97 United States Senate elections were held on various dates in various states. As these U.S. Senate elections were prior to the ratification of the Seventeenth Amendment in 1913, senators were chosen by state legislatures. Senators were elected over a wide range of time throughout 1796 and 1797, and a seat may have been filled months late or remained vacant due to legislative deadlock. In these elections, terms were up for the senators in Class 1.

They coincided with John Adams's election as President. The ruling Federalist Party gained one seat.

Results summary 
Senate party division, 5th Congress (1797–1799)

 Majority party: Federalist (22)
 Minority party: Democratic-Republican (9)
 Vacant: 1 (later filled by Democratic-Republican)
 Total seats: 32

Change in composition

Before the elections 
After the August 2, 1796 admission of Tennessee.

Results of the regular elections

Race summaries 
Except if/when noted, the number following candidates is the whole number vote(s), not a percentage.

Special elections during the 4th Congress 
In these special elections, the winners were seated before March 4, 1797; ordered by election date.

Races leading to the 5th Congress 
In these regular elections, the winner was seated on March 4, 1797; ordered by state.

All of the elections involved the Class 1 seats.

Special elections during the 5th Congress 
In these special elections, the winners were elected after the March 4, 1797 beginning of the next Congress.

Connecticut

Connecticut (regular)

Connecticut (special, class 1)

Connecticut (special, class 3)

Delaware

Georgia (special)

Maryland

Maryland (special, 1796) 

John Eager Howard won election to fill the seat vacated by Richard Potts by an unknown amount of votes, for the Class 1 seat.

Maryland (regular) 

John Eager Howard won re-election over Richard Sprigg Jr. by an unknown amount of votes, for the Class 1 seat.

Maryland (special, 1797) 

James Lloyd won election over William Winder by a margin of 1.12%, or 1 vote, for the Class 3 seat.

Massachusetts

Massachusetts (regular)

Massachusetts (special, class 1)

Massachusetts (special, class 2)

New Jersey

New Jersey (regular)

New Jersey (special)

New York

New York (regular)

New York (special)

Pennsylvania

Rhode Island

Rhode Island (regular)

Rhode Island (special)

South Carolina (special)

Tennessee

Tennessee (initial) 

Tennessee became a state June 1, 1796 and elected its new senators August 2, 1796.

Tennessee (special, Class 1) 

The term of the initially-elected senator, Democratic-Republican William Cocke, ended March 3, 1797 and the Tennessee legislature failed to elect a senator for the new term.  The Governor of Tennessee, therefore, appointed Cocke to begin the term, pending a special election.  Cocke, however, lost that October 6, 1798 special election to Democratic-Republican Daniel Smith.

Tennessee (special, Class 2) 

Democratic-Republican William Blount was expelled July 8, 1797 for conspiracy with the Kingdom of Great Britain.  Democratic-Republican Joseph Anderson was elected September 26, 1797 to finish Blount's term.

Vermont 

Incumbent Democratic-Republican Moses Robinson resigned October 15, 1796.

Federalist Isaac Tichenor was elected October 18, 1796 both to finish Robinson's term and to the new term that would begin March 4, 1797.  However, Tichenor resigned just one year later, October 17, 1797, to become Governor of Vermont.  Federalist Nathaniel Chipman was then elected October 17, 1797 to finish the term.

Vermont (special, 1796)

Vermont (regular)

Vermont (special, 1797)

Virginia

See also
 1796 United States elections
 1796 United States presidential election
 1796–97 United States House of Representatives elections
 4th United States Congress
 5th United States Congress

References
 Party Division in the Senate, 1789-Present, via Senate.gov